Hong Kong competed at the 2016 Summer Olympics in Rio de Janeiro, Brazil, from 5 to 21 August 2016. This was the territory's sixteenth appearance at the Summer Olympics, since its debut as a British colony in 1952.

The Sports Federation and Olympic Committee of Hong Kong, China sent a team of 37 athletes, 13 men and 24 women, to compete in nine sports at the Games. The nation's full roster in Rio de Janeiro was smaller by five athletes than in London, and also, featured more female athletes than males for only the second time in its Olympic history.

Eleven athletes from Hong Kong previously competed at London 2012, including bronze medalist Lee Wai Sze in track cycling, badminton player Yip Pui Yin in the women's singles, mountain biker Chan Chun Hing, and 37-year-old table tennis player Tie Ya Na, who attended her fourth Olympics as the oldest and most experienced member. Other notable athletes on the Hong Kong roster also featured Youth Olympians Doo Hoi Kem (table tennis) and 18-year-old Siobhan Haughey (swimming), Asia's top-ranked épée fencer Vivian Kong, and backstroke swimmer and three-time Olympian Stephanie Au, who was selected by the committee to carry the Hong Kong flag at the opening ceremony.

Unlike the previous Games, Hong Kong failed to win a single medal in Rio de Janeiro. The special administrative region's best medal hope, Lee Wai Sze missed out on a place in the finals of her respective track cycling events, following her involvement in the controversial clash in the women's keirin, and her quarterfinal defeat to Germany's eventual champion Kristina Vogel in the women's sprint. Meanwhile, windsurfer Michael Cheng wrapped up his Olympic campaign with one of Hong Kong's most unexpected outcomes at the Games, finishing eighth overall.

Athletics
 
Hong Kong athletes have so far achieved qualifying standards in the following athletics events (up to a maximum of 3 athletes in each event):

Track & road events

Field events

Badminton

Hong Kong has qualified a total of seven badminton players for each of the following events into the Olympic tournament based on the BWF World Rankings as of 5 May 2016: two entries in the men's singles, one in the women's singles, and a pair each in the women's and mixed doubles.

Men

Women

Mixed

Cycling

Road
Hong Kong has qualified one rider in the men's Olympic road race by virtue of his best individual ranking at the 2015 Asian Championships.

Track
Following the completion of the 2016 UCI Track Cycling World Championships, Hong Kong riders have accumulated spots in women's sprint and women's keirin, as well as both the men's and women's omnium, by virtue of their final individual UCI Olympic rankings in those events.

Sprint

Keirin

Omnium

Mountain biking
Hong Kong has qualified one mountain biker for the men's Olympic cross-country race, by virtue of a top two national finish, not yet qualified, at the 2015 Asian Championships.

Fencing

Hong Kong has entered three fencers into the Olympic competition. Vivian Kong had claimed a spot in the women's épée, as one of the two highest-ranking fencers coming from the Asian zone in the FIE Adjusted Official Rankings. Meanwhile, Cheung Ka Long and London 2012 foil fencer Lin Po Heung were added to the Hong Kong roster by virtue of a top three finish at the Asian Zonal Qualifier in Wuxi, China.

Golf 

Hong Kong has entered one golfer into the Olympic tournament. Tiffany Chan (world no. 434) qualified directly among the top 60 eligible players for the women's event based on the IGF World Rankings as of 11 July 2016.

Rowing

Hong Kong has qualified one boat each in the men's and women's lightweight double sculls for the Olympics at the 2016 Asia & Oceania Continental Qualification Regatta in Chungju, South Korea.

Qualification Legend: FA=Final A (medal); FB=Final B (non-medal); FC=Final C (non-medal); FD=Final D (non-medal); FE=Final E (non-medal); FF=Final F (non-medal); SA/B=Semifinals A/B; SC/D=Semifinals C/D; SE/F=Semifinals E/F; QF=Quarterfinals; R=Repechage

Sailing
 
Hong Kong sailors have qualified one boat in each of the following classes through the individual fleet World Championships, and Asian qualifying regattas. Windsurfers Michael Cheng and Sonia Lo were selected to the Hong Kong roster at the Asian Sailing Championships in Dubai, United Arab Emirates on 14 March 2016.

M = Medal race; EL = Eliminated – did not advance into the medal race

Swimming
 
Hong Kong swimmers have so far achieved qualifying standards in the following events (up to a maximum of 2 swimmers in each event at the Olympic Qualifying Time (OQT), and potentially 1 at the Olympic Selection Time (OST)):

A total of seven swimmers (one man and six women) were selected to the Hong Kong's Olympic roster, with veterans Sze Hang Yu and Stephanie Au racing in the pool for their third Games and Geoffrey Cheah becoming the first male to compete in 12 years.

Men

Women

Table tennis

Hong Kong has fielded a team of six athletes into the table tennis competition at the Games. Tang Peng, Wong Chun Ting, 2014 Youth Olympic runner-up Doo Hoi Kem, and Lee Ho Ching were automatically selected among the top 22 eligible players each in their respective singles events based on the ITTF Olympic Rankings.

Ho Kwan Kit and three-time Olympian Tie Ya Na were each awarded the third spot to build the men's and women's teams for the Games by virtue of a top 10 national finish in the ITTF Olympic Rankings.

Men

Women

See also
Hong Kong at the 2016 Summer Paralympics

References

External links 

 
 

Olympics
2016
Nations at the 2016 Summer Olympics